The short-tailed lark (Spizocorys fremantlii) is a species of lark in the family Alaudidae.

It is found in Ethiopia, Kenya, Somalia, and Tanzania. Its natural habitats are dry savannah, subtropical or tropical dry shrubland, and subtropical or tropical dry lowland grassland.

Taxonomy and systematics
The short-tailed lark was originally placed in the genus Calendula (which was subsequently renamed to Galerida) and then to the monotypic genus Pseudalaemon before it was re-classified to Spizocorys in 2014.

Subspecies 
Three subspecies are recognized: 
 Somali short-tailed lark (S. f. fremantlii) - (Lort Phillips, 1897): Found in south-eastern Ethiopia and Somalia
 S. f. megaensis - (Benson, 1946): Found in southern Ethiopia and northern Kenya
 Kenya short-tailed lark (S. f. delamerei) - (Sharpe, 1900): Originally described as a separate species. Found in southern Kenya and northern Tanzania

Behaviour and ecology

Food and feeding
The diet of the short-tailed lark consists mostly of vegetable material.

References

short-tailed lark
Birds of East Africa
short-tailed lark
Taxonomy articles created by Polbot